"The Hangman" is a poem written by Maurice Ogden in 1951 and first published in 1954 in Masses and Mainstream magazine under the pseudonym "Jack Denoya". Its plot concerns a hangman who arrives in a town and executes the citizens one by one. As each citizen is executed, the others are afraid to object out of fear that they will be next. Finally, there is nobody remaining in the town except the hangman and the narrator of the poem. The narrator is then executed by the hangman, as by then there is no one left who will defend him.

The poem contains four-line stanzas with the rhyming pattern AABB.

The poem is usually cited as an indictment of those who stand idly by while others commit grave evil or injustice, such as during the Holocaust. The story it tells is very similar to that of the famous statement First they came... that has been attributed to the anti-Nazi pastor Martin Niemöller as early as 1946. The poem may be interpreted as an attack on McCarthyism.

Animated film
In 1964, an animated 11-minute film was made by Les Goldman and Paul Julian. Herschel Bernardi narrated. The film was a co-winner of the Silver Sail award at the Locarno International Film Festival in 1964.

See also
 "Not My Business"

References

External links
 
 online archive copies of the 1964 animated film of the poem

Poems about the Holocaust
Works about McCarthyism
1951 poems
Tragedy of the commons
Poems adapted into films